Daqiao is a railway station of the Taiwan Railways Administration (TRA) West Coast line located in Yongkang District, Tainan, Taiwan.

Around the station
 Chi Mei Medical Center
 Southern Taiwan University of Science and Technology
 National Tainan Industrial High School

See also
 List of railway stations in Taiwan

References 

2002 establishments in Taiwan
Railway stations in Tainan
Railway stations opened in 2002
Railway stations served by Taiwan Railways Administration
Yongkang District